Hakea obliqua, commonly known as needles and corks, is a shrub in the family  Proteaceae and is endemic to an area in the Wheatbelt, Great Southern and Goldfields-Esperance  regions of Western Australia.

Description
The branchlets and new growth are rusty coloured. The  strongly scented flowers are in clusters in the leaf axils. The young fruit are smooth and as they age the surface becomes covered in thick angular cork outgrowths. Flowering occurs from May to October.

Taxonomy and naming
This species was first described by Robert Brown in 1810 and published the description in Transactions of the Linnean Society London. The specific epithet obliqua is derived from the Latin obliquus - "oblique, referring to the nectar gland which is on a slant from the flower axis".

Distribution and habitat
Hakea obliqua is found in southern Western Australia from the Stirling Range to Albany area to Israelite Bay and inland to Pingrup. Grows in heath and scrubland on sand and sandy loam.

Conservation status
Hake obliqua is classified as "not threatened" by the Western Australian Government.

References

obliqua
Eudicots of Western Australia
Plants described in 1810
Taxa named by Robert Brown (botanist, born 1773)